Matthew "Matt" McNamara is a fictional character on the American television series Nip/Tuck, portrayed by John Hensley.

Character history
Matthew "Matt" McNamara, was raised as the son of Julia and Sean McNamara, although his biological father is Christian Troy, a man he regards as an uncle. Matt has two half-sisters, Annie (whose father is Sean and mother is Julia) and Emme Lowell (daughter of Christian with a woman named Darlene Lowell) and a younger half-brother, Conor (son of Sean and Julia). He is approximately 16 years of age at the beginning of the show's first season. Although he is not as much of a ruffian in the beginning, it is implied that he was a delinquent in his early years, as Sean says to Christian, "I've spent too many years trying to corral your bad genetics".

Season One
Matt worries about sex with his girlfriend, Vanessa, and her possible reaction to his foreskin. He tells his parents that he wants to have a circumcision; Sean declines to perform the procedure, telling Matt there is nothing wrong with not being circumcised. However, when Vanessa is turned off, Matt decides to circumcise himself after reading a 'how-to guide' on the Internet. Unsurprisingly, his attempt goes wrong and Sean and Christian are forced to perform the operation properly.

After the surgery, Matt discovers that Vanessa was not turned off by his foreskin, but is in fact a lesbian and having an affair with a popular cheerleader, Ridley. When Ridley shows signs of wanting to end their affair, Vanessa persuades Matt to have a threesome with them to keep Ridley interested. The threesomes continue, until Sean and Julia find out and have a family intervention with Ridley and Vanessa's parents. Weeks later, Matt and his friend Henry commit a hit and run while under the influence of marijuana. Both cover up their involvement, but both grow attached to the victim, an outsider whose strict Christian Scientist mother will not allow her to have the necessary surgery to repair her injuries.

Season Two
Henry is arrested and charged for assault and rape. He confesses the hit and run, and Matt testifies against him in court, claiming that he was not in the car at the time of the accident. Meanwhile, Sean and Julia worry about his attitude and ask him to visit life coach Ava Moore. As part of a trust exercise, Ava asks Matt to take a naked photograph of her and later offers him sexual intercourse in return for good grades. Matt and Ava sleep together, and Matt discovers that she has a teenage son, named Adrian.

Meanwhile, Sean, Julia and Christian discover Ava's duplicitous, dangerous nature and Christian takes it upon himself (due to recently discovering he is Matt's biological father) to try to keep Matt away from her after catching him masturbating outside of her window. Matt eventually discovers the truth about his paternity, shattering his relationship with Sean. Adrian begins to display disturbing behavior (stemming from his incestuous relationship with Ava) and runs away from home, while Matt wants to run away with Ava to Paris, France. Sean, Julia and Christian discover that Ava is a MTF transsexual and in return for enhanced vaginal surgery, Ava promises to leave Matt. As she packs, Adrian shows up and kills himself in front of Ava; who leaves his body and flees to Paris.

Season Three
Matt discovers Adrian's body and discovers that Ava was once a man, pushing him to the edge of a breakdown. He visits a transsexual bar and picks up a woman named Cherry Peck. When he discovers that she is a pre-op transsexual, he physically attacks her. As revenge, Cherry and her friends beat him up and urinate on him. Before the incident, Matt shaves his head and taunts Sean. Sean punches Matt, so he files a restraining order against his father. The court order is later dropped, but Sean and Matt continue to be on bad terms.

Matt starts dating Ariel Alderman who; along with the rest of her family, are Neo-Nazis. Matt watches as Ariel bleaches her skin and listens to her racist beliefs. Meanwhile, Cherry comes to McNamara/Troy and asks them to fix her botched plastic surgery for free, as Matt beat her up. Sean is against it, as Cherry and her friends attacked him, too. Having an epiphany, Matt encourages Sean to operate on Cherry and he befriends her. Things spiral out of control when the Alderman family spot Matt and Cherry together and kidnap them. Ariel's father forces Matt to either cut off his own penis, or Cherry's. Matt presumably cuts Cherry's penis off, with Cherry's consent. Ariel's father then drives Matt and Cherry to wasteland outside Miami and forces Matt to bury Cherry alive. Matt stands up to him at gunpoint, however, giving Cherry enough time to hit Alderman from behind with a shovel and shoot him.

Season Four
After the traumatic events of last season, Matt is having a hard time coping and turns to exercise as an outlet, all while isolating himself from friends and family. It is revealed that Alderman survived the assault and is currently in prison.

Matt runs into Christian's erstwhile lover Kimber Henry at his gym, and learns about her religion of Scientology. Hoping that religious faith will help him deal with his guilt over hurting Cherry, he becomes a Scientologist as well - but it soon becomes more of an excuse to see Kimber. She encourages Matt to move out of his parents' home, calling it "toxic", and he begins cleaning roadsides as part of his religious training.

After being rejected by Christian, Kimber tries to get back at him by sleeping with Matt. Several weeks later, Matt and Kimber tell Sean and Christian that they are married and expecting a baby. The couple move in together and Matt films a porn movie with her in an effort to "spice up" their sex life. Matt confesses to Sean that he knows that Kimber only married him to get back at Christian, but he really does love her.

Season Five
Matt shows up in Los Angeles with newborn baby Jenna. He claims that he is now poor, as Kimber gave all their money to Scientology, and that he has left her. In truth, this is nothing but a ruse to get money to pay for his and Kimber's spiraling addiction to crystal meth. Kimber tries to return to the porn industry, but is rejected by producer Ram Peters due to her habit. He does, however, want Matt in a gay porn movie after seeing the size of his penis in the homemade porn movie they made. Matt is willing to do the movie, until Kimber stops him.

After quitting drugs through Scientology, Kimber makes a deal with Sean and Christian to dump Matt in return for surgery on her meth-ravaged face and teeth. Kimber tells Matt that she never loved him and moves in with Ram, taking Jenna with her. Matt later confronts Christian about the breakup, and an argument ensues in which Christian disowns Matt. Devastated, Matt turns to meth and accidentally blows up the motel he is staying in, inflicting severe burns on his body.

While recuperating in hospital, Matt bonds with his burns counselor, Rachel Ben Natan, who was left horrifically scarred by a terrorist's suicide bombing in her native Israel. Matt and Rachel start dating, but Rachel ultimately breaks up with him because she cannot see a future with him. Matt yells at her for daring to be "picky", and that she should consider herself lucky to be with him.

Matt meets one of Christian's patients, Southern girl Emme Lowell, and sleeps with her. Matt and Emme feel a connection like none they have ever felt before. This is explained when Emme reveals that she came to Los Angeles to find her biological father: Christian Troy. Matt and Emme tell their respective parents about their relationship, and are told to end it immediately. Emme plans to return home, and, despite his feelings, Matt makes the right decision and lets her go.

While helping Sean with his physical therapy, Matt reveals that he wants to go into medicine, and that he is taking pre-med courses at a local community college. A few episodes later, Matt realizes he only wants to play a doctor on television, and goes into acting.

Season Six
In the season six premiere, Matt tells Sean and Christian that he has been taking miming classes and plans to perform as a mime as a living. Christian openly derides Matt, and tells him to get a real job. After a horrific day in which he is both robbed of the little money he has earned and his stereo, Matt reaches his breaking point when he attempts to purchase coffee from a coffee shop employee and pulls out a fake handgun which terrifies the employee, and she hands over all the money in the register. Matt then decides to use this disguise to rob other places; he is eventually known as "The Mime" after robbing several stores.

He is arrested, but released from a line-up by the police when a witness fails to identify. Meanwhile, Sean and Christian have become suspicious of Matt's newfound wealth and confront him, but Matt only becomes more reckless and arrogant with his criminal lifestyle. However, he is severely wounded while attempting to rob another convenience store when the clerk shoots him. He makes it to Christian's place and collapses on the floor; he removes his jacket and shows that he is severely wounded. After Sean and Christian treat Matt's wounds, they and Julia come to the realization that Matt will never change despite all their attempts to help him, and that they should turn him in to the police.

Matt, who heard Julia and Christian talking, leaves soon after and breaks into Kimber's home to see his daughter. Kimber catches him, and after learning that he is leaving for Mexico, she begs to go with him. However, at a truck stop, Matt encounters Christian, who tells him that Kimber helped slow him down long enough for Christian to find him and pleads with him to turn himself in. Matt pulls out a handgun and fires it at Christian, but the round only shatters the driver side window. Matt leaves, but ruptures his stitches and calls Sean, who comes to help him. After Sean stitches him up, Matt leaves and finds the police and Christian waiting outside. Matt is handcuffed and read his Miranda Rights as he is led to a squad car.

At the urging of his grandmother Erica, the imprisoned Matt decides to be a witness in regards to Sean and Julia being unfit parents after Erica decides to petition for custody of Annie and Connor following Sean's suicide attempt. She also urges Matt to become a "prison bitch", as she believes he will not survive inside otherwise. When Christian goes to the prison to visit Matt, he is greeted instead by Matt's cellmate, who plans on turning Matt into his "bitch" in exchange for his protection, and tells Christian that Matt has agreed to obtain breast implants. A shocked Christian leaves, and makes an arrangement with the warden to have Matt transferred to another cell (selling his beloved boat to raise enough cash), but Matt's former cellmate is transferred as well and savagely beats Matt. 

Visiting Matt in the prison hospital, Christian refuses to perform the implant surgery on Matt, but instead offers him another option - drugging his cellmate's food with drugs used for chemical castration, thus making it impossible for him to rape Matt. This works for a time, until Matt accidentally drops the bottle (which was hidden in a hollowed-out book) and his cellmate realizes what has been happening to him. He tries to rape Matt with a plunger, and Matt fights back by kicking him in the testicles and then strangling him with the lingerie his cellmate had bought for him.

Some time later, in exchange for performing liposuction on a simple-minded, obese death row inmate named Wesley Clovis to ensure that the execution is successful, Sean and Christian make a deal that Matt is to be released from prison early. As the execution draws near, another inmate confronts Matt and tells him that Clovis is in fact innocent. As Matt is released in preparation for the execution, he begins to tell Sean and Christian about Clovis' innocence. However, realizing that this revelation will cost him his freedom, Matt quickly changes his mind, instead saying that he thinks Clovis has no chance at rehabilitation, and that executing him is the right thing to do. Clovis is executed, and the now corrupt Matt is released from prison.

Matt goes to work in a carpet store after being released from prison, and falls in love with the manager, Ramona. During a therapy session with Christian and Sean, Matt and Ramona tell them that they will soon be married, and that Matt does not want to see them anymore.

Matters seems fine between Matt and Ramona until Ava comes back into Matt's life in the series' penultimate episode.  On the couple's wedding day, Matt gets a text message and goes outside, where Ava is waiting for him in a limo. They drive away as Sean watches.

In the series finale, Matt tells Sean and Christian that he and Ava plan on going to Brazil to find a suitable surgeon to operate on Raphael, Ava's adopted son. Christian later meets Ava and tells her that he will perform the surgery, provided she ends her relationship with Matt and leaves. Ava says that she loves Matt, but Christian believes she is just using him.

Later, while Christian and Sean perform the surgery, Ava tells Matt that she does not want anything to do with him and that she never loved him. This devastates Matt. After the surgery is completed, Ava abandons Raphael when she learns that he will have permanent scarring from the procedure.

That night, Matt goes to Christian's apartment to pick up his daughter, where he has a discussion with Christian about what it means to be a father. Christian tells him that fatherhood means sacrificing everything for one's children, and that he does not think Matt is capable of doing that. Matt says that he knows he can be a good father, and that he wants to make Christian proud of him. Matt tricks Christian into allowing him to leave with his daughter, Jenna, by lying and saying he and his ex-fiancé, Ramona, are going to get married and be a family. In truth (as seen by the audience during his story to Christian), Ramona had berated Matt for jilting her, spitting on him.

Finally, as Ava is preparing to leave, Matt approaches her at the airport. He says he has bought tickets and that he wants to leave with her to Paris. Ava says that she does not love him, but Matt says he can see "the smoke" in her eyes. He tells her that even though he has made bad decisions, Jenna is a good daughter, and she needs a good mother that she can look up to. He goes on to say that he has always loved her and always will. Ava agrees or seems to agree to be with Matt. The three of them are later seen going up the escalator, seemingly ready to begin their life together.

Fictional victims of domestic abuse
Television characters introduced in 2003
Fictional criminals
Fictional methamphetamine users
Fictional characters involved in incest
Nip/Tuck characters
Scientology in popular culture
Teenage characters in television
Juvenile delinquency in fiction
Fictional murderers
Fictional thieves
sv:Nip/Tuck#Matt McNamara